William Henry Walsh  (September 8, 1927 – May 13, 2012) was an American football center who played six seasons in the National Football League (NFL), all with the Pittsburgh Steelers. Walsh then coached in both college and professional football between 1955 and 1991.

Walsh was born in Phillipsburg, New Jersey, and attended the University of Notre Dame.

References

1927 births
2012 deaths
People from Phillipsburg, New Jersey
Sportspeople from Warren County, New Jersey
Players of American football from New Jersey
American football centers
Notre Dame Fighting Irish football players
Pittsburgh Steelers players
Eastern Conference Pro Bowl players
Coaches of American football from New Jersey
Notre Dame Fighting Irish football coaches
Kansas State Wildcats football coaches
Dallas Texans (AFL) coaches
Kansas City Chiefs coaches
Atlanta Falcons coaches
Houston Oilers coaches
Philadelphia Eagles coaches